Each year Softball Australia holds eight National Championships. These are hosted by the various state bodies around Australia on a rotational roster.

In 2006 over 800 people participated in these championship, with every state and territory entering at least one team.

Championships 
Under 16 Girls – Esther Deason Shield
Under 16 Boys – Arthur Allsopp Shield
Under 19 Women's – Elinor McKenzie Shield
Under 19 Men's – Nox Bailey Shield
Under 23 Women's – Joyce Lester Shield
Under 23 Men's – Laing Harrow Shield
Open Women's – Gilleys Shield
Open Men's – John Reid Shield

See also 
Softball Australia

External links 
Australian Softball Federation
International Softball Federation

Softball competitions
Softball in Australia
Softball